Hugh Hastings may refer to:

Hugh Hastings (soldier, died 1347) (c.1310–1347), English administrator and soldier
Hugh Hastings (soldier, died 1369), English soldier and noble who fought in the Hundred Years' War, son of the above
Hugh Hastings (soldier, died 1386), English soldier and noble who fought in the Hundred Years' War, son of the above
Hugh Hastings (playwright) (1917–2004), Australian writer and World War II naval veteran

See also
Hugh Hastings Romilly (1856–1892), British explorer in the Pacific